Ajit Singh Rathore (– 24 June 1724) was the ruler of Marwar region in the present-day Rajasthan and the son of Jaswant Singh Rathore.

Early life 
Jaswant Singh of Marwar died at Jamrud in December 1678. His two wives were pregnant but, there being no living male heir, the lands in Marwar were converted by the emperor Aurangzeb into territories of the Mughal empire so that they could be managed as jagirs. He appointed Indra Singh Rathore, a nephew of Jaswant Singh, as ruler there. Historian John F. Richards stresses that this was intended as a bureaucratic exercise rather than an annexation.

There was opposition to Aurangzeb's actions because both pregnant women gave birth to sons during the time that he was enacting his decision. In June 1679, Durgadas Rathore, a senior officer of the former ruler, led a delegation to Shahjahanabad where they pleaded with Aurangzeb to recognise the older of these two sons, Ajit Singh, as successor to Jaswant Singh and ruler of Marwar. Aurangzeb refused, offering instead to raise Ajit and to give him the title of raja, with an appropriate noble rank, when he attained adulthood. However, the offer was conditional on Ajit being brought up as a Muslim, which was anathema to the petitioners.

The dispute escalated when Ajit Singh's younger brother died. Aurangzeb sent a force to capture the two queens and Ajit from the Rathore mansion in Shahjahanabad but his attempt was rebuffed by Durgadas Rathore, who initially used gunfire in retaliation and eventually escaped from the city to Jodhpur along with Ajit and the two queens, who were disguised as men. Some of those accompanying the escapees detached themselves from the party and were killed as they fought to slow down the pursuing Mughals.

It is believed that the Dhaa Maa (wet nurse) of infant prince Ajit Singh of Marwar, Goora Dhaa put her beloved son on the royal bed instead of Ajit Singh and put the sleeping prince Ajit into a basket and smuggle him with others out of Delhi. Others opine a slave girl with her infant posed as Rani and remained behind to be captured. Aurangzeb deigned to accept this deceit and sent the child to be raised as a Muslim in his harem. Jadunath Sarkar mentioned that Aurangzeb brought up a milkman's son in his harem as Ajit Singh. The child was renamed Mohammadi Raj and the act of changing religion meant that, by custom, the imposter lost all hereditary entitlement to the lands of Marwar that he would otherwise have had if he had indeed been Ajit Singh.

Exile 
Continuing to play along with the deceit, Aurangzeb refused to negotiate with representatives of Ajit Singh, claiming that child to be the imposter. He sent his son, Muhammad Akbar, to occupy Marwar. Ajit Singh's mother mother convinced the Rana of Mewar, Raj Singh I, who is commonly thought to be her relative, to join in fighting against the Mughals. Richards says that Raj Singh's fear that Mewar would also be invaded was a major motivation for becoming involved; another historian, Satish Chandra, thinks that there were several possible alternatives, including Singh seeing an opportunity to assert Mewar's position among the Rajput principalities of the region. The combined Rathore-Sisodia forces were no match for the Mughal army, Mewar was itself attacked and the Rajputs had to retire to the hills, from where they engaged in sporadic guerrilla warfare.

For 20 years after this event, Marwar remained under the direct rule of a Mughal governor. During this period, Durgadas Rathore carried out a relentless struggle against the occupying forces. Trade routes that passed through the region were plundered by the guerrillas, who also looted various treasuries in present-day Rajasthan and Gujarat. These disorders adversely impacted the finances of the empire.

Aurangzeb died in 1707; he was to prove the last of the great Mughals. Durgadas Rathore took advantage of the disturbances following this death to seize Jodhpur and eventually evict the occupying mughal force.

Takes charge of Marwar 

After consolidating his rule over Marwar, Ajit Singh grew increasingly bold as the Mughal emperor Bahadur Shah had marched south. He formed an alliance with Sawai Raja Jai Singh II of Amer and set upon capturing his ancestral lands which had been occupied by the Mughals. The Rajput kings started raiding Mughal camps and outposts, several towns and forts were captured, the biggest blow for the Mughals was however the capture of Sambhar which was an important Salt manufacturing site.

In 1709 Ajit Singh made plans to conquer Ajmer and destroy the Muslim shrines and Mosques, however Jai Singh II was afraid that the destruction of Muslim shrines would lead to the wrath of the Mughal emperor after he had returned from the Deccan. Ajit Singh however ignored Jai Singhs advise and led his army towards Ajmer, ending the Rathore-Kachwaha alliance. Ajit Singh laid siege to Ajmer on 19 February, the Mughal garrison led by Shujaat Khan negotiated with Ajit Singh by offering him 45,000 rupees, 2 horses, an elephant and the holy town of Pushkar in exchange for sparing the shrine and the mosques. Ajit Singh agreed to the terms and returned to his capital.

In June 1710 Bahadur Shah I marched to Ajmer with a large army and called Ajit Singh to Ajmer, he was joined by Jai Singh II. The rebellious Ajit Singh was finally pardoned and was formally accepted as the Raja of Jodhpur by the Mughal emperor.

In 1712 Ajit Singh was given more power with his appointment as Mughal governor of Gujarat.

Role in deposition of Farrukhsiyar
In 1713, the new Mughal emperor Farrukhsiyar appointed Ajit Singh governor of Thatta.  Ajit Singh refused to go to the impoverished province and Farrukhsiyar sent Husain Ali Braha to bring Ajit Singh into line, but also sent a private letter to Ajit Singh promising him blessings if he defeated Husain. Instead Ajit Singh chose to negotiate with Husain, accepting the governorship of Thatta with a promise for a return to Gujarat in the near future. One of the other conditions of the peace agreement was the marriage of one of the daughters of the Jodhpur Raja with the Mughal emperor, Ajit Singh agreed Marry His Daughter to Farrukhsiyar. Ajit Singh used this marriage as a political tool, giving him enough time to forge alliances against the emperor.

Ajit Singh later took his revenge by making an alliance with the Sayyid brothers against Farrukhsiyar. Ajit Singh and his allies, besieged Farrukhsiyar in the Red Fort and after a night-long battle entered the palace grounds, at first Qutb-Ul-Mulk tried to stop Ajit Singh from entering, upon which the enraged Ajit stabbed him to death and told his Rajput and Pathan soldiers to arrest Farrukhsiyar. The emperor was caught hiding in the harem with his mother, wives and daughters. He tried to resist but was caught and dragged to a small room in Tripoliya Gate, where he was tortured and blinded with a needle. The old Mughal officials cried for mercy and Raja Jai singh of Jaipur and Nizam-Ul-Mulk of Hyderabad did send threats but none of them took any action. Rafi-Ud-Darjat was chosen from the princes and Ajit Singh and the Nawab took his hand and placed him on the peacock throne.

Final days 
Ajit Singh remained rebellious even after gaining pardon from the Mughal Emperor and the governorship of Gujarat. Two major expeditions were sent against him, once under Sayyid Hussain Ali Khan and other under Iradatmand Khan. In 1721-22 Ajit Singh led an army and captured many parganas, he captured Mughal territory as far as Narnol and Mewat, which was 16 miles from the Mughal capital. In January 1723 he attacked the Mughal Governor of Ajmer and killed him, 25 Mughal officers were beheaded after the battle and their camp and baggage was looted. In November 1723 the Emperor sent a large army to Marwar which forced Ajit to surrender Ajmer and 13 parganas which he had recently occupied. Ajit Singh sent his son Abhai Singh with gifts and money to the Mughal Capital. Jai Singh II helped Ajit to get a pardon from the emperor. Abhai Singh while acting as an emissary noticed that his father was hated by the Mughal court and the Emperor, he also noticed that the Emperor and the Nazir were planning on annexing Jodhpur. Abhai Singh knew that his father would never personally submit to the Emperor and had delayed meeting the Emperor for a year. According to Jodhpur historians Abhai Singh felt that his father would lead to the ruin of his country and planned for his murder as "It is the Rajput practice to regard his patrimony as his mother, who is a nearer and dearer relative than the natural father". According to Jodhpur sources, the Jaipur raja had supported the assassination by securing the succession of Abhai Singh through the Mughal Emperor if the deed was done. However Persian sources indicate that it was Bakht Singh who assassinated Ajit Singh. Jadunath Sarkar believes that the Jodhpur court blamed the Jaipur raja because of their rivalry.

The practice of sati was common among Rajput nobility in the region: 63 women accompanied Maharaja Ajit Singh onto the funeral pyre.

See also 
 Durgadas Rathore

References 

Notes

Citations

Further reading 

1670s births
1724 deaths
Monarchs of Marwar
People from Lahore
Subahdars of Gujarat